Giulietta e Romeo is a dramma per musica by composer Niccolò Antonio Zingarelli with an Italian libretto by Giuseppe Maria Foppa after the 1530 novella of the same name by Luigi da Porto. The opera premiered at the Teatro alla Scala in Milan on 30 January 1796.

Giulietta e Romeo was composed by Zingarelli in only eight days and it is considered by many scholars to be his best work. The opera remained a part of the Italian repertory well into the nineteenth century and the role of Romeo was a favourite vehicle for Maria Malibran until c. 1830.

Roles

References

External links

Online Italian libretto

1796 operas
Italian-language operas
Opera seria
Operas
Operas by Niccolò Antonio Zingarelli
Operas based on Romeo and Juliet